Ferenc Márton (15 December 1884 – 8 June 1940) was a Hungarian painter and graphic artist born in Csíkszentgyörgy (now Ciucsângeorgiu, Romania). He was a student of Bertalan Székely and the teacher of Adrienn Henczné Deák.

Biography
Ferenc Márton was a disciple of Bertalan Székely and László Hegedűs. In 1908 he won the third prize of a poster competition. He became known primarily for his illustrations in Érdekes Újság. He was the portraitist of the Magyarság newspaper and between the two world wars a collaborator of the far-right side newspaper Új Magyarság. He also made mosaic and art monument projects and sculptures. His disciple was Adrienn Henczné Deák. He died in Budapest.

References 

1884 births
1940 deaths
Landscape painters
People from Harghita County
20th-century Hungarian painters
Hungarian male painters
20th-century Hungarian male artists